This is the discography of Belgian singer, songwriter and dancer Loïc Nottet.

Studio albums

Extended plays

Singles

Other charted songs

Songwriting credits
 Louane - No (2017)

Notes

References

Pop music discographies
Discographies of Belgian artists